Aviesa S.A de C.V is a charter airline of Mexico. Its services are FBO, ACMI, handling, aircraft lease and sale, air taxi, VIP charters, aircraft management, air ambulance, cargo, aircraft repair and support for commercial and private aviation. Founded in 1986 by Grupo Hermanos Abed (GHA), the airline was grounded in 1994 after the company's demise. The airline was reborn the next year as an independent entity and in 2002 was acquired by Asclepiodoto Abed, the former director of GHA. It was under their control until October 2008, when Abed died (presumably from SCLC): after his death, Aviesa was converted into a 100% individual company. Aviesa's base of operations is located at Toluca Airport.

Fleet

Light jets
Learjet 25
Learjet 31
Learjet 35

Mid jets
Cessna Citation Excel
Cessna Citation V
Dassault Falcon 20
Dassault Falcon 50
Hawker 800
Learjet 45
Rockwell Sabreliner

Heavy jets
Bombardier Challenger 601
Bombardier Challenger 605
Bombardier Global Express
Dassault Falcon 7X
Dassault Falcon 900
Dassault Falcon 2000
Gulfstream II
Gulfstream III
Gulfstream IV
Gulfstream V

Commercial jets
Airbus A320
Boeing 737-700
Boeing 737-800

Helicopters
Agusta A109
Agusta A119 Koala
Bell 206
Bell 407
Eurocopter AS365 Dauphin

References

External links
 Aviesa

Charter airlines of Mexico
Airlines of Mexico
Airlines established in 1986
1986 establishments in Mexico